Hippomelanina is a subtribe of metallic wood-boring beetles in the family Buprestidae. There are at least 4 genera and about 15 described species in Hippomelanina.

Genera
 Barrellus Nelson & Bellamy, 1996
 Gyascutus LeConte, 1858
 Hippomelas Laporte & Gory, 1837
 Prasinalia Casey, 1909

References

Further reading

External links

 

Buprestidae